The Treaty of Tudilén (or Treaty of Tudején) was signed between Alfonso VII of León and Castile and Ramon Berenguer IV, Count of Barcelona on 27 January 1151 at Tudilén, near Aguas Caldas in Navarre.

Contents
The partition of Navarre, after the death of García Ramírez of Navarre, was the paramount reason for the treaty. The pact recognised the Aragonese conquests south of the Júcar and the right to expand further south and west, while the Taifas of Murcia, Valencia and Denia were to fall to Ramon. The Kingdom of Portugal was to be destroyed, while Seville was to be shared between Alfonso and Ramon. Consequently, Ramon also agreed to pledge homage for the Taifa of Valencia and a substantial part of Murcia.

Result
The treaty, however, was never implemented due to major offensives by the Almohad Caliphate, and was superseded by the Treaty of Cazola in March 1179.

See also
List of treaties

Notes

References

Sources

1151
Tudilen
12th-century treaties
Treaties of the Kingdom of León
Tudilen
12th century in the Kingdom of León
1151 in Europe
Aragonese conquest of Valencia
12th century in Aragon